= G sound =

g sound may refer to:

- a voiced velar plosive, a hard /ɡ/ sound
- a voiced postalveolar affricate, a soft /d͡ʒ/ sound
- a voiced palatal plosive, a /ɟ/ sound
